The 1967–68 Ranji Trophy was the 34th season of the Ranji Trophy. Bombay won their tenth title in a row defeating Madras in the final.

Highlights
 Madras won all their six matches going in to the final. Bombay won outright only one of their six matches in the tournament
 Gundappa Viswanath made his debut in first class cricket on November 11 scoring 230 for Mysore against Andhra.
 Vikram Thambuswamy took 8 wickets for 37 runs in an innings for Madras v Andhra. But it would be his only first class match
 In all their matches, Madhya Pradesh's middle order was constituted by Vijay Nayudu, Ashok Jagdale and Gulrez Ali who were respectively the grandson of C. K. Nayudu, and the sons of Madhavsinh Jagdale and Mushtaq Ali.

Group stage

South Zone

Central Zone

East Zone

West Zone

North Zone

Knockout stage

Final

Scorecards and averages
Cricketarchive

References

External links

1968 in Indian cricket
Domestic cricket competitions in 1967–68
Ranji Trophy seasons